Ax 'Em (originally titled The Weekend It Lives) is a 1992 American slasher film directed by and starring Michael Mfume, son of United States Representative Kweisi Mfume. The film follows a group of friends on a weekend retreat at a remote cabin in the woods who become the targets of a crazed killer.

Plot 

In 1990, a man named Mr. Mason came home from work to his wife and three children. Mr. Mason proceeded to arm himself with a shotgun, shooting and killing his wife, his daughter Christine and son Chris before turning the gun on himself. When the police arrived to the scene of the crime, the bodies of the children, along with the surviving child, mentally ill Harry Mason, were missing. 

In 2003, college student Michael, a childhood friend and neighbor to Harry Mason and his siblings, decides to take his girlfriend Kea and their friends to his Granddad’s house in the woods for the weekend. Joining Michael and Kea on the trip are Kevin, Michelle and Tonya, along with couples Shawn and Erika, Tony and Kendra, and Rock and Nikki. 

The night before the group departs for their trip, Harry Mason, now grown up, returns to Granddad’s house, breaking in and killing Granddad with a hatchet as he tries to arm himself with a gun. The following day, the group arrive to Granddad’s house, with Michael and the others not questioning where Granddad is. Nikki and Erika discover a revolver in one of the kitchen drawers before deciding to put it back. 

Later that night, Michael takes everyone to the backyard, starts a fire near a stone wall structure, and recounts the story of the Masons for everyone. Michael explains how him and his Granddad were among the search party looking for Harry in their own backyard 13 years prior. During the search, Michael got distracted by a coin tossed on the ground towards him, and when he looked up, the bodies of Harry’s siblings were propped up on the stone wall. Michael ran to get his granddad, but when they returned, the bodies were gone. The story spooks some of them out, and they all turn in for the night.

The next day, a group of young adults named Brian, Sarah and Breakfast are riding in their car when it runs out of gas. Sarah stays behind in the car while Brian and Breakfast venture out in the woods to look for a house with a phone to call for help. The men stumble across the dilapidated Mason house. Breakfast hears a voice inside the house, telling them to leave, but Brian doesn’t hear it. Breakfast runs out of the house, leaving Brian behind, who is then killed by Harry when he smashes a rotary phone over his head. Breakfast runs back to the car, trying to convince Sarah to run away with him. Sarah holds her ground and decides to wait for Brian, and Breakfast runs back to the city, never to be seen again.

Back at Granddad’s house, Rock and Tonya sneak away to the woods nearby cheat on Nikki and make love. As it becomes nighttime, Harry slashes Rock’s arm offscreen, forcing Rock and Tonya to run back into the house, alerting the others that there’s a machete wielding maniac in the woods.

Harry throws Brian’s body through the door, alerting everyone to his presence. The group tries to leave in the cars, only to find out they were tampered with by Harry. Harry barges in the house and hacks Shawn in the arm with a machete, before hacking him to death offscreen. The group run out the backdoor of the house offscreen, and split up offscreen.

Nikki shows Rock and Kevin the revolver from the kitchen drawer that she managed to take while they were escaping the house. Neither one of them wants to take the revolver and wind up dropping it as Harry appears behind them with a baseball bat, scaring Nikki and Kevin away as he knocks Rock unconscious, before taking the revolver for himself and walking away. 

Back at Granddad’s house, Tonya, who apparently hid in the house the entire time instead of running away like the others, tries to exit the front door before Harry appears and kills her by striking her in the face with the machete. Meanwhile, Sarah has finally gone looking for Brian, only to continuously trip and injure herself, before being scared away by Harry, who may or may not have proceeded to kill her offscreen.

Meanwhile, Rock, who regained consciousness offscreen, hides in the Mason house, sitting in a chair and covering himself with a sheet. Nikki, who split up from Kevin offscreen, manages to get into the Mason house, and hides in a nearby closet. Kevin enters the Mason house as well, now with a hysterical and scared Erika, who he reconvened with offscreen. Harry emerges, slashing and killing Erika in the head with the machete. As Kevin runs upstairs to get away, Harry pulls out the revolver and empties it into Kevin, killing him. Nikki discovers the skeletons of Harry’s siblings in the closet she’s hiding in and screams. Harry finds her, slicing her in the wrist with a machete before Rock saves her, knocking Harry down and running away together.

Meanwhile, Michael and Kea venture back into Granddad’s house to get one of his guns. In the house, Michael finds Granddad’s body stashed in the closet with the guns. Michael and Kea are cornered by Harry in the basement, but Michael shoots him 6 times before they escape through a window.

Tony and Kendra stumble across a random car battery laying on the ground before stumbling across Granddad’s car, but it is locked and they can’t get inside. Nikki and Rock reconvene with Tony and Kendra at the car, and soon they are joined by Michael and Kea. Michael unlocks the car and tries to get it started, but it won’t. Tony and Michael open the hood to realize the battery is missing. Tony runs away to get the battery him and Kendra came across earlier as Harry shows up, chasing the others away from the car.

Michael, Kea, Nikki, Rock and Kendra sneak into the Mason basement to hide, and they reconvene with Michelle, who is hiding down there as well. Harry barges in and the group holds their ground. Harry drops the machete, takes out a coin and tosses it to Michael, who now realizes its his childhood friend all grown up. Kea snatches the gun from Michael and shoots Harry multiple times. Harry gets up and grabs his machete, but not before Michael picks up a pitchfork and stabs him in the chest with it.

Tony runs into the basement, telling them the battery is in the car and they got to go. Everyone runs out, while  Michael reloads the gun and shoots Harry multiple times. Michael runs away, meeting up with Kea, Nikki, Kendra, Michelle, Tony and Rock in the car, and they all take off. Unbeknownst to them as they drive away, Harry walks out in the middle of the road behind them, and proceeds to walk away, back into the woods.

Cast 
 Michael Mfume as Michael
 Sandra Pulley as Kea
 Joe Clair as Tony
 Racquel Price as Kendra
 Tracy Wiggs as Rock
 Maria Copper as Nikki
 Kelci Jeter as Tonya
 Greg Jones as Shawn
 Kristine Louisa as Erika
 Fredrick Montgomery as Kevin
 Thomas Hunt as Brian
 D-Taylor Murphy as Breakfast
 Chris Gatewood as Granddad
 Archie Williams as Harry Mason
 Julia Gorin as Sarah
 Arthur M. Jolly as Mother Killed

Reception
Critical reception for Ax 'Em has been overwhelmingly negative, and Beyond Hollywood opined that the film was "one of the most visually atrocious films I’ve come across in a long, long time." Something Awful gave it a rating of - 48, commenting "How do you review a movie so unfit for public viewing that you can't even figure out any of the characters' names?" I-Mockery criticized the film heavily in one of their movie spotlights, remarking "At the end of the credits, the word, "peace" is shown. Never have I seen a stronger case for war." The Baltimore Sun was slightly more positive in its review, commenting that the film initially showed some promise but that "Once the killings begin, the movie ceases to generate much interest."

References

External links
 
 

1992 films
1992 horror films
1990s slasher films
American slasher films
African-American films
African-American horror films
1990s English-language films
American independent films
Films shot in Maryland
1990s American films
1992 independent films